Tulchyn Raion is one of the six regions of Vinnytsia Oblast, located in southwestern Ukraine. The administrative center of the raion is the town of Tulchyn. Population: 

On 18 July 2020, as part of the administrative reform of Ukraine, the number of raions of Vinnytsia Oblast was reduced to six, and the area of Tulchyn Raion was significantly expanded.  The January 2020 estimate of the raion population was

Localities 
 Marusyne

References

 
Raions of Vinnytsia Oblast
1923 establishments in Ukraine